Çoban or Choban is a Turkish name and surname of Persian origin meaning "shepherd". It may refer to:

 Chupan or Çoban (died 1327), Mongol emir in Persia
 Ayşegül Çoban (born 1992), Turkish female weightlifter
 Hüsamettin Çoban (13th century), commander of the Anatolian Seljuks
 Kenan Çoban (born 1975), Turkish actor
 Mehmet Çoban (1905–1969), Turkish Olympian wrestler
 Bekir Çoban-zade (1893–1937), Crimean Tatar poet
 Çoban Mustafa Pasha (died 1529), Ottoman statesman and governor of Egypt
 The Greek island of Kasos

See also
 Çoban salatası, Turkish salad
 Cioban
 Ciobanu

Turkish-language surnames